The 1971 FIBA European Championship, commonly called FIBA EuroBasket 1971, was the seventeenth FIBA EuroBasket regional basketball championship, held by FIBA Europe.

Venues

First round

Group A – Essen

Group B – Böblingen

Knockout stage

Places 9 – 12 in Essen

Places 5 – 8 in Essen

Places 1 – 4 in Essen

Finals – all games in Essen

Final standings

Awards

Team rosters
1. Soviet Union: Sergei Belov, Alexander Belov, Modestas Paulauskas, Anatoly Polivoda, Vladimir Andreev, Priit Tomson, Ivan Edeshko, Alzhan Zharmukhamedov, Zurab Sakandelidze, Mikheil Korkia, Aleksander Boloshev, Aleksei Tammiste (Coach: Vladimir Kondrashin)

2. Yugoslavia: Krešimir Ćosić, Nikola Plećaš, Aljoša Žorga, Vinko Jelovac, Ljubodrag Simonović, Dragutin Čermak, Borut Bassin, Dragan Kapičić, Blagoja Georgievski, Žarko Knežević, Dragiša Vučinić, Davor Rukavina (Coach: Ranko Žeravica)

3. Italy: Dino Meneghin, Pierluigi Marzorati, Massimo Masini, Ivan Bisson, Renzo Bariviera, Carlo Recalcati, Ottorino Flaborea, Marino Zanatta, Giulio Iellini, Giorgio Giomo, Luigi Serafini, Massimo Cosmelli (Coach: Giancarlo Primo)

4. Poland: Edward Jurkiewicz, Grzegorz Korcz, Andrzej Seweryn, Jan Dolczewski, Henryk Cegielski, Marek Ladniak, Jerzy Frolow, Janusz Ceglinski, Waldemar Kozak, Miroslaw Kalinowski, Eugeniusz Durejko, Zbigniew Jedlinski (Coach: Witold Zagórski)

References

1971
1971–72 in European basketball
International basketball competitions hosted by West Germany
1971 in West German sport